Sergio Pablo Catalán Duque (born 29 August 1991) is a Chilean footballer that currently plays as defender for Chilean club Colchagua.

He began his career at Curicó Unido.

References

External links
 

1991 births
Living people
Chilean footballers
Primera B de Chile players
Curicó Unido footballers
Magallanes footballers
Association football defenders